Monster Force is a 13-episode animated television series created in April 9, 1994 by Universal Cartoon Studios and Canadian studio Lacewood Productions. The story is set in approximately 2020 and centers on a group of teenagers who, with help of high tech weaponry, fight off against classic Universal Monsters and spiritual beings threatening humanity. Some of the crew have personal vendettas (e.g., one has the "curse of the Wolfman" that has been handed down through generations and another had a family member taken away from her by Dracula), while others fight for mankind out of a sense of altruism. The series aired in syndication alongside another Universal animated series, Exosquad. Universal Studios Home Entertainment released the first seven episodes to DVD on September 15, 2009.

Story 
In the distant future, six college students and their professor have formed the Monster Force, a squad dedicated to keeping the world safe from the likes of Dracula, The Mummy and an evil legion of supernatural criminals known as the creatures of the night.

Characters 
The "good guys" bear the name of "Monster Force" and are led by Dr. Reed Crawley. Creatures of the Night (de facto led by Dracula, the greatest vampire in history) represent the "bad guys".

Monster Force 
 Dr. Reed Crawley alias Doc (voiced by Lawrence Bayne)
A young yet brilliant scientist who is also the main tactician and strategist of the team. He has once been Dracula's captive and since then vowed to end his reign of terror. Apparently, he is the inventor of the entire cutting-edge weaponry and equipment used by Monster Force. One of his most brilliant inventions is the EMACS (Energized Monster Armed Containment Suit) or simply power suit, which allows normal humans to fight superhuman dark powers at the same level.
 Luke Talbot alias the Wolfman (voiced by Paul Haddad)
The only werewolf in the team and the only one (apart from Frankenstein) who doesn't utilize high-tech devices invented by Doc. He is actually a good-natured young man affected by lycanthropy, which has been the curse of his family for generations. During the full moon, when he cannot control the curse, his teammates have to restrain him but otherwise his Wolfman form makes him nearly invincible in a monster-to-monster fight. He's apparently descended from Lawrence Talbot, the original wolfman.
 Tripp Hansen alias the Martial Artist (voiced by Philip Akin)
A man of action and a self-confident optimist who enjoys fighting itself. A martial arts specialist, when aided by his power suit he becomes even more powerful and deadly. He also possesses a special technique called Storm Strike. His motto: "One monster at a time!"
 Lance McGruder alias Powerhouse Marksman (voiced by David Hewlett)
The long-range weapon specialist of the team since his power suit contains the greatest amount of firepower and is capable of shooting beams of cold, heat, electricity, as well as other elements. In the normal life, he is a modest, rather shy but always good-spirited and curious young man.
 Shelley Frank alias the Psychic (voiced by Caroly Larson)
The infiltration and intelligence specialist of the team. She is the only female member of Monster Force, as well as the only one whose power suit enables her to fly above the ground. However, she had to sacrifice most of her power suit's firepower for this ability. She is also capable of limited telepathy. Apparently, one of her family members has been killed by Dracula. Her name is a play off Mary Shelley, author of the novel Frankenstein.
 Frankenstein alias the Monster (voiced by Howard Jerome)
The same monster that was created by Victor Frankenstein in the novel under the same name. However, in the series he is with the "good guys" and is a member of Monster Force. He possesses incredible strength (can lift and throw ten times his own weight) and endurance as well as extremely resilient skin. Moreover, once killed, he can be resurrected if approximately 20 kV is applied to his body.) Frankenstein also has some familial ties to Shelley Frank.

Creatures of the Night 
 Dracula alias Prince of Darkness is the arch-villain of the series and the archenemy of Monster Force team and, personally, Dr. Crawley. He is a vampire and a Master of Evil but seems polite, charming and noble. His abilities include metamorphosis, hypnotic powers, illusion and summoning spells, as well as great tactical and strategic capabilities that match Reed Crawley's talents. Dracula is voiced by Robert Bockstael.
 Creature from the Black Lagoon alias the Creature is a mysterious amphibian being that has destroyed entire villages throughout the decades. It can survive both above and below the water, possesses immense physical strength and a special ability of a supersonic shrill sound that shatters objects. It appears and disappears ominously.
 HoTep alias the Mummy is based upon the classic Universal Monster played by Boris Karloff. HoTep was a priest in ancient Egypt who loved Princess Ananka and, when she died, tried to resurrect her. For his transgressions, he has been cursed and entombed for thousands of years, but modern archaeologists accidentally revived him. As an undead sorcerer, he possesses many powers like super strength and limited invulnerability (not against energy attacks), commands sandstorms and can shapeshift into a dust devil. Moreover, he is able to cast a super cold breath that instantly freezes objects and people. HoTep is voiced by Robert Bockstael.
 Niles Lupon alias Bela the Werewolf is a seemingly harmless older man who inflicted the curse of lycanthropy upon the Talbot family starting with Lawrence Talbot (Luke Talbot's grandfather). His harmless facade fooled just about all of the Monster Force members until the wolf-headed cane he always carried with him was recognized from Lawrence's journal. Though old, his werewolf form is extremely powerful with super strength, speed, and invulnerability to all but silver and energy weapons. Though his name technically references actor Béla Lugosi, who played the werewolf responsible for infecting Lawrence Talbot with lycanthropy in the 1941 Wolf Man film, this is merely consistent with the original film, where the character's name was also 'Bela'. Lupon is voiced by Rob Cowan.
 The Bride is the female monster created by Dr. V. Frankenstein to be a companion for his original creature. Not really evil, she simply wants to be left alone by everyone, including her intended husband who still loves her deeply. She has the same powers as the Monster.

Episodes

See also 
 Universal Monsters
 Drak Pack
 The Monster Squad (1987 film)
 Monster Squad (1970s TV series)
 Vampire films
 List of vampire television series
 The Mummy: The Animated Series
 Mummies Alive!

References

External links 
 
 Monster Force fansite

Action figures
1990s American animated television series
1994 American television series debuts
1994 American television series endings
American children's animated action television series
American children's animated adventure television series
American children's animated science fantasy television series
American children's animated horror television series
1990s Canadian animated television series
1994 Canadian television series debuts
1994 Canadian television series endings
Canadian children's animated action television series
Canadian children's animated adventure television series
Canadian children's animated science fantasy television series
Canadian children's animated horror television series
Dracula television shows
Playmates Toys
Television series by Universal Animation Studios
Television series about werewolves
English-language television shows
Vampires in television